Hush...Hush, Sweet Charlotte is a 1964 American psychological thriller film directed and produced by Robert Aldrich, and starring Bette Davis, Olivia de Havilland, Joseph Cotten, Agnes Moorehead, and Mary Astor in her final film role. It follows a middle-aged Southern woman, suspected in the unsolved murder of her lover from decades before, who is plagued by bizarre occurrences after summoning her cousin to help challenge the local government's impending demolition of her home. The screenplay was adapted by Henry Farrell and Lukas Heller, from Farrell's unpublished short story "What Ever Happened to Cousin Charlotte?"

Following his previous success adapting Farrell's novel What Ever Happened to Baby Jane?, Aldrich originally cast the film to reunite Davis with Joan Crawford, despite their notorious turbulence on set. Principal photography began with Davis in the title role and Crawford as Miriam, but shooting was postponed while Crawford dropped out and the role was recast with de Havilland. The film was a critical success, earning seven Academy Award nominations.

Plot
In 1927, young Southern belle Charlotte Hollis and her married lover John Mayhew plan to elope during a party at the Hollis family's antebellum mansion in Ascension Parish, Louisiana. Charlotte's father, Sam, confronts John over the affair and intimidates him with the news that John's wife Jewel visited the day before and revealed the affair. John pretends to Charlotte he can no longer love her and that they must part. Shortly after, John is ambushed and decapitated in the summerhouse by an assailant with a cleaver. Charlotte returns to the house in a bloodstained dress, which all of the guests witness.

Thirty-seven years later, Charlotte, a spinster, having inherited the estate after her father died, is tended to by her loyal housekeeper, Velma. In the intervening years, John's death has remained an unsolved murder, though it is commonly held that Charlotte was responsible. Despite notice from the Louisiana Highway Commission that she has been evicted from the property to make way for the impending construction of a new interstate, Charlotte is defiant, and threatens the demolition crew with a rifle. Seeking help in her fight against the Highway Commission, Charlotte summons Miriam, a poor cousin who lived with the family as a girl, but has since moved to New York City and become wealthy. Miriam returns and soon renews her relationship with Drew Bayliss, a local doctor who jilted her. Charlotte's sanity soon deteriorates following Miriam's arrival, her nights haunted by a mysterious harpsichord playing the song John wrote for her and by the appearance of his disembodied hand and head. Suspecting that Miriam and Drew are after Charlotte's money, Velma seeks help from Mr. Willis, an insurance investigator from England who is still fascinated by the case and who has visited Mayhew's ailing widow, Jewel; she gave him an envelope only to be opened after her death.

Miriam fires Velma, who later returns to discover Charlotte has been drugged. Velma plans to expose Miriam's exploitation of Charlotte, but Miriam kills Velma with a chair and she falls down the stairs. Drew covers up the murder by declaring it an accident. One night, a drugged Charlotte runs downstairs in the grip of a hallucination, believing that John has returned to her. After Miriam tricks the intoxicated Charlotte into shooting Drew with a gun loaded with blanks, the two dispose of his body in a swamp. Charlotte returns to the house and witnesses the revived Drew walking downstairs after he returned, reducing her to insanity. Believing she has shattered Charlotte's mental state, Miriam celebrates with Drew in the garden, where they discuss the plan to have Charlotte committed to a psychiatric hospital and usurp her fortune. Charlotte overhears the entire conversation from the balcony, except for Miriam's admission that she had witnessed Jewel kill John, and has been using the knowledge to blackmail Jewel throughout the years. Charlotte kills Miriam and Drew, pushing a large stone flowerpot off the stair balcony.

The next day, the authorities escort Charlotte from home, as a crowd gathers around to observe the spectacle. Charlotte receives an envelope from Mr Willis, which he received from Jewel (who died of a stroke after hearing of the incident which occurred on the previous night), ostensibly confessing to the murder of her husband John.  As the authorities leave with Charlotte, she looks back at the house.

Cast

Production

Development and casting
Following the unexpected box office success of What Ever Happened to Baby Jane? (1962), Aldrich wanted to make a film with similar themes for Joan Crawford and Bette Davis. Their feud was infamous and legendary, and they were not initially eager to repeat themselves. 
Writer Henry Farrell, on whose novel the film had been based, had written an unpublished short story called "What Ever Happened to Cousin Charlotte?" that Aldrich envisioned as a suitable follow-up. It told a similar story of a woman who manipulates a relative for personal gain, but for this film, Aldrich's idea was that the two actresses would switch the roles from the previous one, with Crawford playing the devious cousin trying to manipulate the innocent Davis into giving up her estate. Aldrich's frequent collaborator, Lukas Heller, wrote a draft of the screenplay, but was replaced by Farrell in late 1963.

Three other cast members from What Ever Happened to Baby Jane? were cast in Hush...Hush, Sweet Charlotte: Wesley Addy, Dave Willock and Victor Buono.

The cast included Mary Astor, a friend of Davis' since their days at Warner Bros. Astor retired from acting and died in 1987. She said:

Filming

Principal photography of the film began in mid-1964, with the on-location shooting commencing in Baton Rouge, Louisiana. However, the shoot was temporarily suspended on several occasions early on. Initially, it was halted after a third-party lawsuit was brought against Davis by Paramount Pictures over a commitment to complete additional filming on Where Love Has Gone (1964). When this was resolved, filming recommenced.

The production was postponed again to allow Crawford to recover after she was admitted into the hospital due to an upper respiratory ailment, though Aldrich hired a private investigator to track her and determine whether or not she was actually ill. By August 4, 1964, the production had been suspended indefinitely, and the studio's insurance company insisted that Crawford be replaced, or else the film would have to be cancelled entirely.

Aldrich sought several actresses to replace Crawford, including Loretta Young, and Vivien Leigh, but they were each either unable or unwilling to take the role. Aldrich ultimately sought Olivia de Havilland for the part, and flew to her home in Switzerland to attempt to convince her to take the role. de Havilland agreed and she subsequently flew to Los Angeles to begin filming. In later interviews, de Havilland expressed displeasure with the film: "I wasn't thrilled with the script, and I definitely didn't like my part. I was reverse-typecast, being asked to be an unsympathetic villain. It wasn't what people expected of me. It wasn't really what I wanted to do. Bette wanted it so much, so I did it. I can't say I regretted it, because working with her was special, but I can't say it was a picture I am proud to put on my resume. Given the choice, I wouldn't have deprived Joan Crawford of the honor." According to Crawford, she only learned of her firing from a news radio broadcast. However, despite  being replaced (and because a planned reshoot with de Havilland in Louisiana was cancelled), brief footage of Crawford made it into the film, when she is seen sitting in the taxi in the wide shot for Miriam's arrival at the house (Crawford can be seen peering out of the window wearing dark sunglasses/clothing).

Scenes outside the Hollis mansion were shot on location at Houmas House plantation in Louisiana. Scenes of the interior were shot on a soundstage in Hollywood.

Musical score
The title song by Frank de Vol became a hit for Patti Page, who recorded a version which reached no. 8 on the Billboard Hot 100.

Release

Box office

According to Fox records, the film needed to earn $3,900,000 in rentals to break even and made $4,950,000, meaning it made a profit of $1,050,000. In France, the film sold 79,168 tickets.

Critical reception
Hush...Hush, Sweet Charlotte was another hit for Aldrich, opening to positive reviews. A pan, however, came from The New York Times. Bosley Crowther observed, "So calculated and coldly carpentered is the tale of murder, mayhem and deceit that Mr. Aldrich stages in this mansion that it soon appears grossly contrived, purposely sadistic and brutally sickening. So, instead of coming out funny, as did Whatever Happened to Baby Jane?, it comes out grisly, pretentious, disgusting and profoundly annoying."

Varietys reviewer wrote: "Davis' portrayal is reminiscent of Jane in its emotional overtones, in her style of characterization of the near-crazed former Southern belle, aided by haggard makeup and outlandish attire. It is an outgoing performance, and she plays it to the limit. De Havilland, on the other hand, is far more restrained but nonetheless effective dramatically in her offbeat role." Judith Crist wrote about the film, "The guignol is about as grand as it gets." Kenneth Tynan asserted that "(Davis) has done nothing better since The Little Foxes." A later review for Time Out (London) observed: "Over the top, of course, and not a lot to it, but it's efficiently directed, beautifully shot, and contains enough scary sequences amid the brooding, tense atmosphere. Splendid performances from Davis and Moorehead, too."

On the review aggregator website Rotten Tomatoes, 82% of 28 reviews are positive, with an average rating of 7.3/10.

Accolades

Moorehead won the Golden Globe for Best Supporting Actress. The film also received seven nominations (two more than Baby Jane: one less in the acting category, namely for Davis) for the 37th Academy Awards, breaking the record as the most for a horror film up to that time.

Home media
The film was first released on DVD on August 9, 2005. It was re-released on April 8, 2008, as part of The Bette Davis Centenary Celebration Collection 5-DVD box-set. On October 17, 2016, It was released onto high-definition Blu-ray in the US by Twilight Time as a 3,000-print limited edition. Another Blu-ray edition was released in the UK by Eureka Entertainment as a part of their "Masters of Cinema" collection on January 21, 2019.

See also
List of American films of 1964
 Psycho-biddy

References

Sources

External links
 
 
 
 

1964 films
1964 horror films
1960s mystery films
1960s psychological thriller films
Southern Gothic films
20th Century Fox films
American psychological horror films
American mystery thriller films
American black-and-white films
Edgar Award-winning works
1960s English-language films
Films about murder
Films based on short fiction
Films directed by Robert Aldrich
Films featuring a Best Supporting Actress Golden Globe-winning performance
Films scored by Frank De Vol
Films set in 1927
Films set in 1964
Films set in Louisiana
Films shot in Louisiana
Psycho-biddy films
1960s American films